Cédric Beullens (born 27 January 1997) is a Belgian professional racing cyclist, who currently rides for UCI ProTeam .

Major results
2014
 8th Overall Keizer der Juniores
2015
 1st Overall Keizer der Juniores
1st Stage 2
2017
 1st Stage 3 Ronde van Vlaams-Brabant
 8th Grand Prix de la ville de Pérenchies
2019
 1st Stage 2 Ronde van Vlaams-Brabant
 2nd Ronde van Vlaanderen Beloften
 5th Kattekoers
 7th Grand Prix Criquielion
2020
 6th Trofeo Playa de Palma
2021
 1st  Combativity classification, Tour of Belgium
 10th Grote Prijs Jef Scherens
2022
 4th Memorial Rik Van Steenbergen

Grand Tour general classification results timeline
Sources:

References

External links
 

1997 births
Living people
Belgian male cyclists
Cyclists from Antwerp Province
People from Sint-Katelijne-Waver
21st-century Belgian people